For the Scottish electronic musician, see Linus Loves.

Duncan Overbeck Reid (born 28 September 1989) is a Hong Kongese-Canadian  professional basketball player for the Bay Area Dragons of the East Asia Super League (EASL).

Professional career
He has played for South China in the A1 Division Hong Kong and the FIBA Asia Champions Cup. Reid was drafted third overall in the 2017 CBA Draft by the Zhejiang Golden Bulls.

National team career
He represented the Hong Kong basketball team at the 2015 FIBA Asia Championship in Changsha, China, where he recorded the most points, rebounds, assists and blocks for his team.

Notes

References

External links 
 Player Profile at the 2015 FIBA Asia Championship
 Player Profile at Asia-basket.com
 Player Profile at RealGM.com

1989 births
Living people
Basketball players at the 2014 Asian Games
Centers (basketball)
South China AA basketball players
Hong Kong men's basketball players
Hong Kong people of Canadian descent
Zhejiang Golden Bulls players
Asian Games competitors for Hong Kong
Nanjing Tongxi Monkey Kings players
Philippine Basketball Association players
Bay Area Dragons players